The Annisquam Bridge is a historic bridge in Annisquam, Massachusetts, a village within the city of Gloucester. The bridge was built in 1861 to replace an earlier 1847 bridge that crossed Lobster Cove. It is a wooden pile bridge, a type of which only two others were found in New England as part of a c. 1979 survey. The bridge has repeatedly been the subject of safety closings and restorative work over the course of the 20th century, and was completely rebuilt in 1946–7, removing the draw. Despite this, it was closed to vehicular traffic in 1968, and pedestrian traffic in 1987. The bridge has since been rehabilitated, and is open to pedestrian traffic.

The bridge was listed on the National Register of Historic Places in 1983.

See also
List of bridges documented by the Historic American Engineering Record in Massachusetts

References

External links

Road bridges on the National Register of Historic Places in Massachusetts
Bridges completed in 1861
Bridges in Essex County, Massachusetts
Buildings and structures in Gloucester, Massachusetts
Historic American Engineering Record in Massachusetts
National Register of Historic Places in Essex County, Massachusetts
1861 establishments in Massachusetts
Wooden bridges in the United States